Something Is Expected is Theresa Sokyrka's second album, released on August 29, 2006, by Maple Music.

Album information
Except for "Bluebird", the album contains all original songs. Michael Timmins of the Cowboy Junkies and The New Pornographers members John Collins and David Carswell split the album's production duties. Dave Thompson, guitarist/producer for High Holy Days and Leslie Carter mixed "Yours Is Yours".

Singles
The first single from the album was "Waiting Song", released in Canada. A music video was made, and can be seen on MuchMoreMusic. Sokyrka travelled to Peru to create her second video for the second single, "Sandy Eyes", which also aired on MuchMoreMusic.

Track listing

Personnel
Adapted from the liner notes of Something Is Expected.

Performers and musicians
Justin Abedin – electric guitar
Rob Becker – bass guitar
Richard Bell – Hammond B3, Wurlitzer
Jeff Bird – bass guitar
Pete Bourne – drums
David Carswell – electric guitar
Rob Chursinoff – drums
John Collins – acoustic guitar, bass guitar, electric guitar, omnichord, tambourine
Randall Coryell – drums

Jaro Czerwinec – accordion
Peter Elkas – electric guitar
Ryan Marchant – electric guitar
Curtis Phagoo – bass guitar
Tyler Reimer – drums, shaker, xylophone
Rod Salloum – Hammond B3, melodica, Nord organ, piano
Harold Sokyrka (Theresa's father) – accordion
Theresa Sokyrka – acoustic guitar, vocals
Michael Timmins – acoustic guitar

Production
Joe Dunphy – mixing
George Graves – mastering
Howard Redekopp – mixing
Jeff Wolpert – mixing

Photography
Dustin Rabin – cover photo
Allison Woo – album design, tray photo
Brock French – photo editing

References

2006 albums
Theresa Sokyrka albums
MapleMusic Recordings albums